Sceloporus occidentalis biseriatus is a subspecies of the western fence lizard. The common name of S.o. biseriatus is the San Joaquin fence lizard. There are several subspecies of the western fence lizard, all of which are found in the far western part of North America.

See also
 Coast Range fence lizard
 Island fence lizard
 Northwestern fence lizard

Notes

References
 Hobart M. Smith (1995) Handbook of Lizards: Lizards of the United States and of Canada, Cornell University Press, 557 pages 
 C. Michael Hogan (2008) "Western fence lizard (Sceloporus occidentalis)", Globaltwitcher, ed. Nicklas Stromberg 
 

Sceloporus